Kelly Ann Hu (born February 13, 1968) is an American actress, voice artist, former fashion model and beauty queen who was Miss Teen USA 1985 and Miss Hawaii USA 1993. Hu starred as Dr. Rae Chang on the American television soap opera Sunset Beach and as Michelle Chan on the American television police drama series Nash Bridges. She has starred in numerous films including The Scorpion King (2002) as Cassandra, Cradle 2 the Grave (2003) as Sona, X2 as Yuriko Oyama / Lady Deathstrike (2003), The Tournament (2009) as Lai Lai Zhen, and White Frog (2012).

Hu has had recurring roles as Pearl on The CW series The Vampire Diaries, as China White on the CW series Arrow, Hamato Miwa / Karai on Teenage Mutant Ninja Turtles, Stacy Hirano on the Disney Channel animated series Phineas and Ferb, and as Adira in Rapunzel's Tangled Adventure.

Early life
Hu was born in Honolulu, Hawaii, the daughter of Juanita Perez, an engineering drafter from Honolulu, and Herbert Hu, a salesman and exotic bird breeder. Her parents divorced during Hu's childhood. Her brother, Glenn, is a Lieutenant Colonel and Human Resources Officer in the United States Army. She is of Chinese, English, and Hawaiian descent. She attended Maemae Elementary School and Kamehameha Schools in Honolulu, Hawaii.

Hu has held a lifelong interest in singing and dancing and has also been interested in martial arts since her early childhood. Hu's cousin was a successful model in Japan, and Hu decided to follow her example. Kelly Hu won the title of Miss Hawaii Teen USA and competed in the Miss Teen USA 1985 pageant, becoming the Miss Teen USA pageant's third titleholder in history and its first Asian American winner. Hu has mentioned in interviews that her mother had told her America was not ready for an Asian as such a prominent role model. She discovered after winning that she was prohibited from appearing in non-contest related activities for the year of her reign, though this rule was changed in later years.

Career

Hu modeled in Japan and Italy, and became well known in the latter as the star of a series of television advertisements for Philadelphia brand cream cheese, playing a young Japanese college student named Kaori.

Hu won the title of Miss Hawaii USA in 1993, becoming the first former Miss Teen USA to win a Miss USA state title. In the 1993 Miss USA pageant, held in Wichita, Kansas, Hu entered the top ten in second place, after winning the preliminary interview competition and placing second and third, respectively, in swimsuit and evening gown. She then made the top six, ranked second, winning the top ten evening gown competition and placing second in swimsuit. She was eliminated in fourth place after the judges' questions, just 2/100 of a point from the final three.

Hu moved to Los Angeles and began her acting career in 1987, with a guest starring role as Mike Seaver's Hawaiian love interest on the sitcom Growing Pains. Hu followed this with appearances on various television series, including Night Court, Tour of Duty, 21 Jump Street and Melrose Place. Her first film role was in Friday the 13th Part VIII: Jason Takes Manhattan. In 1995, Hu starred as an undercover police officer in the film No Way Back. Hu was cast as Dr. Rae Chang on Sunset Beach for six months in 1997. Afterwards, she was cast as police officers Michelle Chan in the television series Nash Bridges, and Pei Pei "Grace" Chen on Martial Law. Her subsequent film appearances include The Scorpion King (2002) and Cradle 2 the Grave (2003). In X2 (2003), she appeared as Yuriko Oyama/Deathstrike, William Stryker's controlled partner.

She was Agent Mia Chen on the last three episodes of the television series Threat Matrix in 2004. She also starred in 2005's Underclassman alongside Nick Cannon and in 2006's Americanese, Undoing and Devil's Den. During the first quarter of 2007, she completed filming the film Stilletto, followed by Farmhouse.

In January 2007, Hu began appearing in a full-time role on the television series In Case of Emergency. She played Kelly Lee, a Korean American woman who accidentally reunites with her high school classmates and realizes none of them grew up according to their high school plans. The show did not have a successful run, being cancelled after airing 12 episodes and leaving its season finale un-aired. The same year she appeared in films, The Air I Breathe and Shanghai Kiss. By the same year, Hu recurringly voiced Stacy Hirano in the animated series Phineas and Ferb until 2015 when the show ended. In 2020, she would reprise her role in the animated film Phineas and Ferb the Movie: Candace Against the Universe.
 
In 2009, she appeared in the film The Tournament as Lai-Lai Zhen. In April 2009, Hu developed the character JIA for Secret Identities: The Asian American Superhero Anthology. She was the first guest actor to cross over between the television series, NCIS: Los Angeles and NCIS, playing Lee Wuan Kai in a two-episode arc within both series. In 2010 and 2011, Hu guest-starred as a vampire named Pearl on the CW television series, The Vampire Diaries.

In 2010, Hu began a recurring role on the CBS television series Hawaii Five-0. In 2012, Hu was cast in the role of Karai in the animated series Teenage Mutant Ninja Turtles. She commented: "It wouldn't quite be the first time I played a ninja, I think. Yeah, I don't know why people think I'm dangerous, but for some reason, I keep getting these roles for the ninja, assassin, bodyguard, bad-girl type." In 2013, she joined the cast of the series Warehouse 13 as Abigail Cho, the new owner of the Warehouse-connected B&B.

She also provided voice talents in video games including Star Wars: Knights of the Old Republic II The Sith Lords as Visas Marr, the Sith woman who joins the Jedi Exile's party, and Batman: Arkham Origins as Lady Shiva, among the eight assassins hired by Black Mask to kill Batman (a role she reprised in the 2021 animated film Batman: Soul of the Dragon). In a personal first, she lent both her face and voice to the in-game character Khai Minh Dao in Battlefield Hardline, who partnered alongside the protagonist in roughly half of the game levels.

Hu has been featured twice in Maxim magazine (May 2002 and May 2005). In 2015, she became the face of Viagra, appearing in the commercials.

Personal life
Hu is an avid poker fan and has frequently taken part in competitions such as the World Series of Poker and World Poker Tour, including the WPT Celebrity Charity match on March 3, 2008. She was part of HollywoodPoker.com's "Celebrity Poker Night" on May 30, 2006, and in July 2006 placed in the top 200 in the World Series of Poker Ladies Tournament, besting nearly 1,000 other competitors.

Activism

Hu has supported the Center for Asian Americans United for Self Empowerment and in 2004 starred in a public service announcement for them titled "The Least Likely" to encourage young Asian Americans to register and vote.

In 2007, Hu was a driver in the Toyota Pro/Celebrity Race, a national fund-raising program supporting children's hospitals throughout the United States. In April 2011, Hu was a celebrity host for Save the Children's "Caring for Japan's Keiki," a benefit for Japanese earthquake and tsunami victims. Also in 2011 she hosted a Celebrity Poker Tournament in support for Best Buddies International, a charity to which she has given support for several years.

In January 2008, Hu participated in a video for Barack Obama produced by will.i.am called "Yes We Can". She campaigned for Obama in Hawaii in the run-up to the February 19, 2008, Democratic caucuses. In February 2008, Hu also appeared in another viral video in support of Obama, "Sí Se Puede Cambiar", written and performed by Andrés Useche, directed by Eric Byler. She was the emcee of the Asian American Action Fund's annual fundraiser on June 10, 2008. She was present at the DNC national convention in 2008.

Hu has been active to protect the Hawaiian ecology. She supported Reef Check Hawaii by running in and successfully completing the Honolulu Marathon to raise awareness for the organization. She also gave support to the Shark Fin Ban which took effect in Hawaii July 2010. This made it illegal to possess, sell, or distribute shark fins in Hawaii.

Filmography

Film

Television

Video games

References

External links

 
 
 
 
 
 

1968 births
20th-century American actresses
21st-century American actresses
Actresses from Honolulu
Actresses from Los Angeles
Female models from Hawaii
American film actresses
American actresses of Chinese descent
American people of Native Hawaiian descent
American soap opera actresses
American television actresses
American video game actresses
American voice actresses
Hawaii Democrats
Kamehameha Schools alumni
Living people
Miss Photogenic at Miss USA
Miss Teen USA winners
Miss USA 1993 delegates
Hawaii people of Chinese descent
Native Hawaiian actresses